Adventure Landing is a group of amusement parks located in Florida, New York, North Carolina and Texas. The first park was opened in Jacksonville Beach, Florida in 1995 by Adventure Entertainment Company. It was a success and nine other Adventure Landing parks were constructed.

Adventure Landing also manages and operates several other family entertainment centers throughout the United States. Adventure Landing runs 13 amusement parks nationwide.

History
Prior to Adventure Landing's founding; founder Hank Woodburn spent 24 years working with the Putt-Putt Golf Courses of America, specializing in updating the locations, to include new features that Putt-Putt introduced. In 1994, Woodburn updated the two Jacksonville, Fl, Putt-Putt locations to include go-karts, batting cages, and arcades. That same year, Woodburn acquired land at Beach Blvd in Jacksonville Beach to open up a new park known as Adventure Landing. The first Adventure Landing opened in 1995 by Woodburn's company Adventure Entertainment Company.

The first Adventure Landing was constructed on 18 acres in Jacksonville Beach. Initial cost was $5 million, which included a waterpark. The central structure contained the video arcade, laser tag, snackbar, prize counter, restrooms and other attractions. It was surrounded by miniature golf, batting cages, go-kart track and the water park.

On December 18, 2002, a management-led buyout was completed by Adventure Landing LLC for the four profitable parks owned by Adventure Entertainment.

The five Adventure Landing locations owned by Adventure Landing LLC were purchased in April 2011 by National Retail Properties (NRP), a Real Estate Investment Trust based in Orlando, Florida. All the locations were sale-leaseback transactions, so Adventure Landing LLC continued to operate the facilities.

In 2012, Adventure Landing purchased The Beach Waterpark in Mason, OH, which reopened in May 2013 as The Beach at Adventure Landing.

In March 2020, due to the COVID-19 pandemic, the locations were closed for a few months, although have later reopened with safety precautions (such as sanitization of high touch points & six feet marks).

The Blanding Boulevard location in Jacksonville was closed Summer 2021 after 24 years in operation. The property was purchased to build a parking lot for Amazon's new delivery center.

The Adventure Landing in Jacksonville Beach was sold in 2021 and a 427-unit apartment complex was planned for the site. The parks were slated to close Halloween 2021, but construction was first delayed until end-of-year 2021, then the date was pushed back until August 31, 2022, possibly longer. Former owner NRP announced that they were searching Jacksonville for a location to rebuild a new, larger facility.

Operation
There is no admission for the amusement parks; all the attractions are pay as you play. The water park is seasonal and requires a fee for admission. Not all features are at all parks. All parks included miniature golf and an arcade. Aside from the park in Buffalo, New York, all locations had go-karts, laser tag, and batting cages. Some parks had unique attractions, such as the Wacky Worm Rollercoaster at the Jacksonville Beach location. Special accommodations are available for large group events.

Amusement Park Features
 Adventure Speedway Go-Karts: a quarter mile track with racing results posted on a finish-line leader board. 
 Batting Cages: Participants specify hardball, softball, slow pitch or fast pitch with speeds ranging up to 70 mph.  
 Frog Hopper: A safe, bouncing ride designed for young children. 
 Laser Tag: The course, named, Area 51, included two levels and a maze. The game was played in twilight with lightning flashes and the sound of weapon fire. Scoring was automatic and participants were given a printout of their results. 
 Max Flight: A roller coaster simulator with 360° range of motion.  
 Miniature Golf: Two 18-hole miniature golf courses designed to be fun, regardless of skill level.  
 Sweet Adventures: an old-fashioned candy shop. 
 Teddy Bear Factory: a stuffed animal could be created interactively.
 Wacky Worm Roller Coaster: The ride was intended for youngsters or small children and their parents.  
 Video Arcade: All locations had this feature, with up to 100 machines. All games used tokens and many games dispensed tickets which could be redeemed for prizes. 
 Snack Bar: Pizza, drinks and snack food.

Formerly available
 Bumper Boats: Electric powered boats that functioned just like bumper cars, but on a pond. Each boat had a built-in squirt gun.
 Wow Factory: A 3-story interactive playland and slide, containing 9,000 foam balls to climb in. Cannons & geysers kept the balls moving.

Shipwreck Island
Shipwreck Island is the waterpark co-located at Adventure Landing in Jacksonville Beach, Florida. It was constructed in 1995 but opened a few months after the Amusement Park.

Water Park Features
 Typhoon Lagoon: a 500,000 gallon wave pool with 3-4' waves.
 Lil’ St. John’s River: a 720' lazy river. 
 Hydro Halfpipe: a water version of skateboarding half-pipe. 
 Eye of the Storm: a 40' diameter bowl that flows like a whirlpool. 
 Splash Cove: a toddler play area. 
 Rage: an uphill water coaster with speeds up to 18mph. 
 Undertow: a 400' double-raft flume ride with speeds up to 23mph. 
 Cabana rentals.

Formerly available
 Pirate Play: a 62' pirate ship with water cannons, slides & waterfalls.

Jacksonville Beach Location 
In June 2021, it was announced that the Jacksonville Beach site would close in October 2021 due to the lease owner's decision to construct an apartment building and parking lot. In October of 2022, as the park continued to operate through the past year, it was announced that Adventure Landing in Jacksonville Beach, Florida, will stay open until the end of September 2023 after a new agreement with their landlord.

Things to Do 

 Shipwreck Island Waterpark (only open when temperature is above 70 degrees Fahrenheit) 
 Cabanas 
 Gator Alley 
 Island Gift Store 
 Laser Tag
 Miniature Golf
 Wacky Worm Rollercoaster
 Batting Cages
 Arcade
 Adventure Speed Go-Karts
 Frog Hopper
 Max Flight 3D
 Teddy Bear Factory
 Sweet Adventures Candy Shop

Pricing 

 Shipwreck Island Waterpark
 2023 Season Pass - $129.99
 2023 Daily Admission - Adult $42.99  Child $32.99
 2023 Special Admissions
 Night Splash (Beginning June 3rd 3pm-Close) - $31.99
 Saturday Swim Nights (June 17th - June 29th, Every Saturday, 6pm-10pm) - $21.99

 Lockers - small lockers $10, medium $12, jumbo $15
 Family Friday Night Special - (6pm - close, for 4 guests) Large Pizza, 4 soft drinks, 100 Arcade Tokens OR 4 Attraction Tickets $29.99
 Three attraction pass - $27.99
 Five Attraction pass - $34.99
 Three hour unlimited attraction pass (Saturday and Sunday Only) - $39.99

Adventure Landing Locations
 Florida: Jacksonville Beach, St. Augustine
 New York: Buffalo, Tonawanda
 North Carolina: Raleigh, Winston-Salem, Gastonia
 Texas: Dallas

Other Locations
 Ohio:  The Beach at Adventure Landing located in Mason and two Magic Mountain Fun Centers located in Columbus 
 Missouri:  Cool Crest Family Fun Center located in Independence
 Kansas:  All Star Sports Entertainment & All Star Adventures located in Wichita

Former Locations 

 Florida: Jacksonville (Blanding Boulevard), Daytona Beach
 North Carolina: Charlotte
 New York: Greece
 Texas: Amazing Jake's Food & Fun located in Plano

References

External links 
 

Amusement parks in Florida
Video arcades
1995 establishments in Florida
Buildings and structures in Jacksonville, Florida
Entertainment companies established in 1995
Tourist attractions in Jacksonville, Florida